Ying Huo, Yinghuo, or Ying-huo may refer to:

 Yinghuo-1, a failed 2011 Chinese Mars spaceprobe
 "Yinghuo" , the ending theme for Legend of the Phoenix
 Yinghuo, the classical planet Mars in Chinese astronomy
 Ying Huo, a character in Xuan-Yuan Sword: Scar of Sky

See also
 Firefly
 Huo
 Huo Ying (disambiguation)
 Ying (disambiguation)